Warwick’s is the oldest continuously family-owned bookstore in the United States. It was founded in 1896 and is located in La Jolla, California.

History
Warwick's was founded in 1896 by William T. Warwick in Minnesota. The bookstore later moved to Iowa and then to La Jolla, California.

In 1952, Warwick's moved to its current location at 7812 Girard Avenue in La Jolla, California.

In 2021, the owner of the building where Warwick's was located planned to sell the building. Nancy Warwick reached out to the community and was able to raise $8.35 million to buy the building. More than thirty people contributed to the fund.

References

1896 establishments in Minnesota
American companies established in 1896
Antiquarian booksellers
Book selling websites
Bookstores established in the 19th century
Companies based in San Diego County, California
Ebook suppliers
Independent bookstores of the United States
Online retailers of the United States
San Diego County, California
Privately held companies based in California
Retail companies established in 1896